The Great Temptation is a 1952 West German drama film directed by Rolf Hansen and starring Dieter Borsche, Ruth Leuwerik and Renate Mannhardt. It was made at the Bavaria Studios in Munich. The film's sets were designed by the art directors Franz Bi and Botho Hoefer.

Synopsis
A successful surgeon conceals from his colleagues that he has never formally received any medical qualifications having learned his skills working as a medical orderly in a Soviet prisoner of war camp.

Cast
 Dieter Borsche as Richard Gerbrand
 Ruth Leuwerik as Hilde
 Renate Mannhardt as Sylva
 Carl Wery as Medizinalrat Dr. Bosch
 Paul Bildt as Dr. Riebold
 Claus Biederstaedt as Famulus Huber
 Ulrich Bettac as Judge
 Friedrich Domin as Defense lawyer Dr. Frank
 Heinrich Gretler as Bürgermeister Max Händel
  as Dr. Schnetz
 Harald Holberg as Alexander Rochwald
 Bruno Hübner as Professor Dr. Nanken
 Erich Ponto as Professor Dr. Gandolphi
 Rudolf Reiff as Generaldirektor Witt
  as Dr. Köberl
 Franz Schafheitlin as Landrat Rochwald
 Ernst Schröder as Prosecutor
 Paula Braend as Oberschwester Therese
 Lina Carstens
 Marion Morell as Schwester Narzisse
  as Frau Rochwald
 Edith Schultze-Westrum as Frau Riebold

References

Bibliography 
 Hake, Sabine. German National Cinema. Routledge, 2013.

External links 
 

1952 films
1952 drama films
German drama films
West German films
1950s German-language films
Films directed by Rolf Hansen
Films set in hospitals
Films based on German novels
German black-and-white films
Films shot at Bavaria Studios
1950s German films